Parviterribacter is a Gram-positive and non-spore-forming genus of bacteria from the family of Parviterribacteraceae.

References

 

Actinomycetota
Bacteria genera